The U.S. state of Wyoming is known for its reliably conservative politics and heavy support for the Republican Party, particularly in federal elections.

Democratic voters, in the minority, are concentrated in more urban areas such as Teton County. Despite the imbalance in registration, Wyoming voters have elected relatively conservative Democrats to local, state and federal offices such as the state's 31st governor, Dave Freudenthal.

In a 2020 study, Wyoming was ranked as the 25th hardest state for citizens to vote in.

Presidential

United States presidential election in Wyoming, 2020
United States presidential election in Wyoming, 2016
United States presidential election in Wyoming, 2012
United States presidential election in Wyoming, 2008
United States presidential election in Wyoming, 2004
United States presidential election in Wyoming, 2000
United States presidential election in Wyoming, 1996
United States presidential election in Wyoming, 1992
United States presidential election in Wyoming, 1988
United States presidential election in Wyoming, 1984
United States presidential election in Wyoming, 1980
United States presidential election in Wyoming, 1976
United States presidential election in Wyoming, 1972
United States presidential election in Wyoming, 1968
United States presidential election in Wyoming, 1964
United States presidential election in Wyoming, 1960
United States presidential election in Wyoming, 1956
United States presidential election in Wyoming, 1952
United States presidential election in Wyoming, 1948
United States presidential election in Wyoming, 1944
United States presidential election in Wyoming, 1940
United States presidential election in Wyoming, 1936
United States presidential election in Wyoming, 1932
United States presidential election in Wyoming, 1928
United States presidential election in Wyoming, 1924
United States presidential election in Wyoming, 1920
United States presidential election in Wyoming, 1916
United States presidential election in Wyoming, 1912
United States presidential election in Wyoming, 1908
United States presidential election in Wyoming, 1904
United States presidential election in Wyoming, 1900
United States presidential election in Wyoming, 1896
United States presidential election in Wyoming, 1892

National legislative
United States Senate election in Wyoming, 2020
 United States House of Representatives election in Wyoming, 2020
United States House of Representatives election in Wyoming, 2016
United States Senate election in Wyoming, 2014
United States House of Representatives election in Wyoming, 2014
United States Senate election in Wyoming, 2012
United States House of Representatives election in Wyoming, 2012
United States House of Representatives election in Wyoming, 2010
United States Senate election in Wyoming, 2008
United States House of Representatives election in Wyoming, 2008
United States Senate election in Wyoming, 2006
United States House of Representatives election in Wyoming, 2006
United States House of Representatives election in Wyoming, 2004
United States Senate election in Wyoming, 2002
United States House of Representatives election in Wyoming, 2002
United States Senate election in Wyoming, 2000
United States House of Representatives election in Wyoming, 2000
United States House of Representatives election in Wyoming, 1998
United States Senate election in Wyoming, 1996
United States House of Representatives election in Wyoming, 1996
United States Senate election in Wyoming, 1994
United States House of Representatives election in Wyoming, 1994
United States House of Representatives election in Wyoming, 1992
United States Senate election in Wyoming, 1988
United States Senate election in Wyoming, 1976
United States Senate election in Wyoming, 1970

State executive
Wyoming gubernatorial election, 2022
Wyoming gubernatorial election, 2018
Wyoming gubernatorial election, 2014
Wyoming gubernatorial election, 2010
Wyoming gubernatorial election, 2006
Wyoming gubernatorial election, 2002
Wyoming gubernatorial election, 1998
Wyoming gubernatorial election, 1994
Wyoming gubernatorial election, 1990
Wyoming gubernatorial election, 1986
Wyoming gubernatorial election, 1982
Wyoming gubernatorial election, 1978
Wyoming gubernatorial election, 1974
Wyoming gubernatorial election, 1970
Wyoming gubernatorial election, 1966
Wyoming gubernatorial election, 1962
Wyoming gubernatorial election, 1958
Wyoming gubernatorial election, 1954
Wyoming gubernatorial election, 1950
Wyoming gubernatorial election, 1946
Wyoming gubernatorial election, 1942
Wyoming gubernatorial election, 1938
Wyoming gubernatorial election, 1934
Wyoming gubernatorial election, 1930
Wyoming gubernatorial election, 1926
Wyoming gubernatorial special election, 1924
Wyoming gubernatorial election, 1922
Wyoming gubernatorial election, 1918
Wyoming gubernatorial election, 1914
Wyoming gubernatorial election, 1910
Wyoming gubernatorial election, 1906
Wyoming gubernatorial special election, 1904
Wyoming gubernatorial election, 1902
Wyoming gubernatorial election, 1898
Wyoming gubernatorial election, 1894
Wyoming gubernatorial election, 1892
Wyoming gubernatorial election, 1890

Ballot measures 

 List of Wyoming ballot measures

See also
Political party strength in Wyoming

References

External links
 
 
  (State affiliate of the U.S. League of Women Voters)
 
 

 
Government of Wyoming
Political events in Wyoming